Kent Stuart Ruhnke (born September 18, 1952) is a Canadian former ice hockey player who played two games in the National Hockey League, with the Boston Bruins, and 72 games in the World Hockey Association, with the Winnipeg Jets, between 1976 and 1978. He later spent several years playing in the Swiss National League A. He later worked as a coach in Switzerland. As a youth, he played in the 1965 Quebec International Pee-Wee Hockey Tournament with the Scarboro Lions minor ice hockey team.

Career statistics

Regular season and playoffs

References

External links
 

1952 births
Living people
Barrie Flyers players
Binghamton Dusters players
Boston Bruins players
Canadian ice hockey right wingers
EHC Biel players
EHC Olten players
HC Fribourg-Gottéron players
SC Riessersee players
Ice hockey people from Toronto
Toronto Varsity Blues ice hockey players
Undrafted National Hockey League players
Winnipeg Jets (WHA) players
ZSC Lions players